Anjunabeats Volume 7 is the seventh album in the Anjunabeats Volume compilation series mixed and compiled by British trance DJs Above & Beyond and released on 5 October 2009. Copies pre-ordered through Recordstore.co.uk were signed by the three members of Above & Beyond; Jono Grant, Tony McGuinness and Paavo Siljamäki.

Track listing

References

External links

2009 compilation albums
Above & Beyond (band) albums
Anjunabeats compilation albums
Sequel albums
Electronic compilation albums